Rune Rudberg (born 23 August 1961) is a Norwegian singer originating from Trøgstad in Østfold singing dansband music. He has a hectic live music career with more than 5000 concerts in Norway.

He is best known for his song "Ut mot havet" in 1988. The same titled album peaked VG-lista albums chart. He also took part on two occasions in Norwegian Melodi Grand Prix in a bid to represent Norway in Eurovision. The first was in MGP 1989 with "Vinger over Europa" failing to make it to Final 3. Twelve years later, he took part in MGP 2001 with the self-written and composed song "Without You". But he finished fifth failing to make to the Final 4 stage. In 2017, he participated again with his band in MGP 2017 with "Run Run Away", but failed to reach the Gold Final.

Besides his solo career, he was part of the dansband Scandinavia on and off. He was a member from 1990 to 1994, then for two years 1996 and 1997, and finally 2004–2005, when he left after news about his use of narcotics.

Discography

Albums
Studio

Compilations

Albums as part of Scandinavia dansband
1991: På oppforring
1992: Scandinavia 3
1993: Scandinavia 4

Singles 

Featured in

References

Norwegian male singers
Melodi Grand Prix contestants
1961 births
Living people
People from Trøgstad
Musicians from Østfold